Vernon Campbell Sewell (4 July 1903 – 21 June 2001) was a British film director, writer, producer and, briefly, an actor.

Sewell was born in London, England, and was educated at Marlborough College. He directed more than 30 films during his career, starting with Morgenrot (1933) and ending with Burke & Hare (1971). He worked chiefly in B-movies, some of which were, according to the BFI Screenonline, "well above the usual cut-price standards of film-making at this level."

He was married to the actress Joan Carol (born Joan Roscoe Catt 1905-1986) in 1950. Vernon Sewell died on 21 June 2001 in Durban, South Africa, at age 97.

Filmography (director)

1933: Morgenrot
1934: The Medium
1937: A Test for Love
1938: Breakers Ahead
1939: What Men Live By
1943: The Silver Fleet
1945: The World Owes Me a Living
1945: Latin-quarter
1945: Frenzy
1947: The Ghosts of Berkeley Square
1948: Uneasy Terms
1949: The Jack of Diamonds
1951: The Dark Light
1951: The Black Widow
1952: The Floating Dutchman
1952: Ghost Ship
1953: Counterspy
1954: Dangerous Voyage
1954: Radio Cab Murder
1955: Where There's a Will
1956: Johnny, You're Wanted
1956: Soho Incident (aka Spin a Dark Web)
1956: Home and Away
1957: Rogue's Yarn
1958: Battle of the V-1
1959: Wrong Number 
1960: Urge to Kill
1961: House of Mystery
1961: The Wind of Change
1961: The Man in the Back Seat
1962: Strongroom
1963: A Matter of Choice
1963: Strictly for the Birds
1967: Some May Live
1968: The Blood Beast Terror
1968: Curse of the Crimson Altar
1971: Burke & Hare

References

External links

1903 births
2001 deaths
English male film actors
English male screenwriters
English-language film directors
German-language film directors
People educated at Marlborough College
Male actors from London
Film directors from London
20th-century English male actors
20th-century English screenwriters
20th-century English male writers